Ten Yard Fight was an American straight edge, football-themed band formed in 1995 in Boston. Along with In My Eyes and Floorpunch, they spearheaded the youth crew revival in 1997. Ten Yard Fight's "official" last show was in Boston on October 17, 1999, which would become the first National Edge Day. They would later play additional shows with partial lineups.

Biography
Ten Yard Fight played their first show with Moreschi clad in a combination of football gear and punk rock clothing. After receiving positive feedback the band decided to become more serious. Ten Yard Fight began performing on the East Coast.

Having sold 1,000 copies of their demo, Ten Yard Fight teamed up with Big Wheel Recreation to release the Hardcore Pride 7-inch in 1996. The initial pressing sold out in less than a week, helping generate a buzz that resulted in the band's signing to Equal Vision. During that time they also released a split 7-inch with Fastbreak. The first result of the partnership was to compile the demo and Hardcore Pride 7-inch onto a single CD. Ten Yard Fight would next release an album entitled Back on Track. Lineup changes followed, as the group toured Europe and the United States through 1997 and 1998. In 1998, the band recorded six new songs that would later surface on The Only Way EP.

In between these releases TYF appeared on many different compilation recordings. At the end of 1999, TYF played their last show together with friends Bane, Reach the Sky, and In My Eyes. This show was at the Karma Club on Lansdowne Street as the Yankees and Red Sox were playing right across the street in the ALCS at Fenway Park. The final lineup of the band included Anthony Moreschi, guitarist John LaCroix (who started out playing bass), guitarist Timmy Cosar (who later formed American Nightmare), bassist Brian "Clevo" Ristau, and drummer Ben Chused.

'The Only Way: 1995-1999', a DVD/video documentary, had its release celebrated a year later with Ten Yard Fight taking the stage, unannounced, at "Edge Day Two," coinciding with the final performance of Boston's In My Eyes. During the 4+ years that TYF was around, the band played all over the world, including several US tours, a European tour, many shows in Canada and even a weekend of 2 shows in Puerto Rico where Steve Reddy caused permanent spinal damage to LaCroix.  At some point between May 2000 and June 2005 LaCroix had penned the first “Edge Confession” letter when he broke edge.  This was follow closely by Ray Lemoine (former tour driver) penning a similar letter known to scholars as the “State of the Edge Address.”

Aftermath

Ristau and Moreschi reunited as 'First And Ten' at National Edge Day 2007 in Haverhill, MA. 'First And Ten' played a show with Slapshot in Haverhill, MA on November 8, 2008.

Moreschi went on to front Stand & Fight on Bridge 9 Records, and currently sings in Resist featuring members from DrugxTest and Since the Flood.

John Lacroix moved to California and started the band that would become Terror. He now plays guitar in Portland hardcore band, Unrestrained.

Discography
Demo '95 (1995)
Hardcore Pride (April 15, 1995)
Back on Track (July 17, 1997)
The Only Way (1999)

See also
Youth Crew
Straight Edge
Posicore

References

External links
 Ten Yard Fight interview on RAP AROUND part 3, 1995

Musical groups from Boston
Hardcore punk groups from Massachusetts
Straight edge groups
Equal Vision Records artists